Triodos Bank N.V. is an ethical bank based in the Netherlands with branches in Belgium, Germany, United Kingdom and Spain. It was founded in 1980. Triodos Bank finances companies which it believes add cultural value and benefit to both people and the environment. That includes companies in the fields of solar energy, organic farming or culture.
As of 2021, Triodos Bank has over 750,000 customers worldwide.

History 
The name Triodos is derived from the Greek "τρὶ ὁδος - tri hodos," meaning "three roads" (people, planet, profit).
The bank was initially founded as an anthroposophical initiative with a mission to realise and promote quality of life in the broadest sense, not just here and now but over the long-term and from a global perspective.
 
In 1980 Triodos launched the first "green fund", a fund for environmentally friendly projects, on the Amsterdam Stock Exchange. Friends of the Earth in the Netherlands claims that transferring 10,000 euros in savings from a "climate laggard" such as ABN Amro to Triodos will effectively result in a carbon dioxide emissions saving equivalent to what would be achieved by not driving a car for six months. The bank compensates 100% of its own CO2 emissions.

Triodos took over the British ethical bank Mercury Provident in 1994.

The bank operations and customer support are mainly offered digitally, but adapt to local business norms. In Spain, for example, several physical offices have been opened in major towns.

As of December 31, 2015, the Triodos Banking Group had a business volume of around EUR 12.3 billion, issued over 44,000 (2015) loans and managed over 700,000 customer accounts in Europe.

Triodos Bank received the Sustainable Bank of the Year 2009 award from the Financial Times and the International Finance Corporation (IFC), an organization of the World Bank, having been selected from 165 institutes from 42 countries.

Philosophy 
The Triodos Bank refers to their work as the anthroposophical principle of social threefolding. The bank transfers its customers' deposits exclusively to the real economy, thereby financing companies, organizations and projects which it believes contribute to ecological, social or cultural change. In accordance with this philosophy, Triodos Bank in Germany purchases electricity from the green energy provider Naturstrom AG.

Transparency 

Triodos "publish details of every organisation [they] lend to, and invest in". The bank displays its annual report online for loans and funds entrusted, which highlights key Triodos Bank facts and figures.

Policy 
Savers can open conventional savings accounts, as well as ethical funds and venture capital. Triodos also offer conventional personal current accounts and business banking services. Triodos also has an active international department, supporting microfinance initiatives across the developing world. Triodos is the only commercial bank in the UK to provide an annual list of all the loans the bank has made.

Triodos Bank maintains the following policy concerning the financial activities and investments:

Criteria for lending 

Triodos is unusual in that it only lends to businesses and charities judged to be of social or ecological benefit. This "positive screening" extends its policies beyond those of ethical banks which solely avoid investing in companies judged to be doing harm ("negative screening"). The bank uses money deposited by close to 100,000 savers and lends it to hundreds of organisations, such as fair trade initiatives, organic farms, cultural and arts initiatives, renewable energy projects, and social enterprises.

"[Triodos] does not lend to organisations, businesses and projects that are directly involved for more than 5% of its activities in non-sustainable products and services or non-sustainable working processes. Triodos Bank will however, to the best of its knowledge, exclude all organisations, businesses and activities that produce or distribute nuclear energy, weapons, fur, pornography and environmentally hazardous substances"

Shareholders 
Triodos is owned through depositary receipts by private investors and a small number of institutional investors. At the end of 2021 the bank had 43,521 depository receipt holders.

Triodos Bank's shares are owned by the Stichting Administratiekantoor Aandelen Triodos Bank (SAAT), which subsequently issues depositary receipts to individuals and institutions, which entitle them to payment of a dividend, but to which only a limited voting right is attached. Depositary receipts for shares of the bank are not traded on any stock exchange. Holders are not allowed to own more than 10% of the shares and the maximum number of votes per holder in the general meeting of depositary receipt holders is limited to 1,000. This construction was chosen to prevent hostile takeovers.

Triodos has managed trading in certificates itself since its inception. Mainly as a result of the COVID-19 epidemic, an imbalance arose between buyers and sellers of certificates, whereby there were more sellers than buyers. The bank therefore temporarily suspended trading on 18 March 2020. Trading resumed on 13 October 2020, with a cap of €5,000 for sales, which was later reduced to just €1,000. Trading was halted again on 5 January 2021. This led to a reaction from certificate holders. They joined forces in November 2021 in the 'Triodom' platform, from which the Triodos Bank Depositary Receipt Holders Foundation was established in March 2022, representing concerned customers with a combined depository capacity of €120 million. On 10 October 2022 the foundation filed a petition with the Enterprise Chamber of the Amsterdam Court of Appeal asking it to investigate, which the bank regrets.

On 21 December 2021, Triodos decided to start trading the certificates on a multilateral trading facility (MTF), a trading platform that is only accessible to registered participants and can therefore protect the autonomy and mission of the bank. The price of the certificates will then be determined by supply and demand rather than, as previously, on the basis of the net asset value of the bank. With a view to tax reporting obligations, the bank has applied an administrative discount of 30% to the value of the certificates from 31 December 2021. The last traded price of certificates was €84 on 5 January 2021 but for tax purposes they are valued at only €59. Because trading is not expected to restart until the 2nd quarter of 2023, a restrictive certificate buyback programme was planned in 2021 for certificate holders with an urgent need to sell their shares. However in August 2022, the bank announced that this plan would be withdrawn and proposed instead to pay an extraordinary dividend of €1.01 per depository receipt (before withholding tax).

On 11 October 2022 the bank’s shareholder, SAAT, approved the move to the MTF. Captin BV has been chosen to manage the MTF.

See also

Ethical banking
GLS Bank, another ethical bank founded as an anthroposophical initiative
Global Alliance for Banking on Values
Shared Interest

References

External links

 
 Integrated Annual Report 2019
 Fair Finance Guide Netherlands (screening of Triodosbank)
 The Colour of Money, a print and online magazine produced by the bank

Banks of the Netherlands
Ethical banking
Anthroposophy
Social enterprises
Companies based in Utrecht (province)
Zeist